Walter L. Miller (born 26 February 1830) was a member of the Wisconsin State Assembly.

Biography
Miller was born on February 26, 1830, in York County, New Brunswick. Later that year, he moved with his parents to Rushford, Wisconsin. He would own a saw mill and become involved in the lumber industry and would own and captain a steamboat on the Fox River and the Wolf River. On June, 1874, Miller married Frances McCabe.

Political career
Miller was elected to the Assembly in 1888. The previous year, he had been elected President (similar to Mayor) of Winneconne, Wisconsin. He was a Republican.

References

People from York County, New Brunswick
British emigrants to the United States
Businesspeople from Wisconsin
People from Winnebago County, Wisconsin
Republican Party members of the Wisconsin State Assembly
Mayors of places in Wisconsin
1830 births
Year of death missing
Pre-Confederation Canadian emigrants to the United States
People from Winneconne, Wisconsin